Marshal of the branch (or "marshal of the branch of service") was from 1943 to 1974 the designation to a separate rank class in the general officer's rank group of the former Soviet Union's armed forces.

However, at that time, marshal of the branch was also the lowest marshal-rank of the Red Army, and later of the Soviet Army. Marshal of the branch was nominally the equivalent rank level to army general. However, general officers on that particular rank were not authorised, competent and mandated to be appointed to, or to act on the position of commander in chief of a big formation or command.

Establishment
The term "marshal of the branch" was calqued from the German  (general of the branch). The ranks of marshal of aviation, artillery and armoured troops branches were established on February 4, 1943, with a large, approximately 50mm wide, shoulder board star (the same star as the at-the-time equivalent rank of marshal of the Soviet Union's shoulder board star). When the rank of chief marshal was established on October 27, 1943, the size of the shoulder board's stars for marshals was made about 10mm smaller establishing the superiority of the marshal of the Soviet Union insignia. Also, on October 27, 1943, the ranks of marshal of the branches engineer troops and signals were established. On the uniform tie, marshals wore the marshal's star of the 2nd level.

In the branches, the rank of colonel general was followed by the next higher rank of marshal of the branch. While the rank of marshal of a branch was apparently equal to the one of general of the army (who was only entitled to the four small shoulder board stars), the marshals of branches had the marshal's star of the 2nd level on the tie and the large 40mm star on the shoulder boards, but the general of the army had neither. Generals of the army were given the 40mm star shoulder board and the marshal's star of the 2nd level on the tie in 1974.

Marshals of branches were normally eligible for promotion to chief marshal of branch, however, neither was eligible for promotion to marshal of the Soviet Union.  After 1984, the rank of marshal was preserved only in the air force and artillery. Later, the rank of marshal stopped being conferred even in these branches. The regulations of Russian Army, confirmed in 1993, unified the system of general ranks in all the branches: the ranks of marshal of artillery and marshal of aviation were replaced by the one of general of the army (or army aviation), and the rank of chief marshal was cancelled.

Rank insignia
The rank insignia of marshal of the branch was a large (~50mm-wide) five-pointed shoulder board star (at the time the same star was used on the shoulder boards of marshals of the Soviet Union). A marshal of the branch wore the second level five-pointed marshal's star on his uniform necktie.

When the rank of chief marshal of the branch was established, the size of the shoulder board stars for marshals was made about 10mm smaller, indicating the superiority of the marshal of the Soviet Union. The first level marshal's star was worn on the uniform tie of chief marshals of the branch and marshals of the Soviet Union.

In the branches, the rank of colonel general was succeeded by the rank of marshal of the branch, while the rank of marshal of a branch was apparently equal to the rank of general of the army (who was only entitled to the four small shoulder board stars). Marshals of branch, chief marshals of the branch and general of the army were at the OF9-level, generals of the army had neither marshals' stars on shoulder boards or uniform ties. However, in 1974, generals of the army were given the 40mm star shoulder board and the marshal's star of the second level on the tie.

Marshals of the branches were normally eligible for promotion to chief marshal of branch, however, neither was eligible for promotion to marshal of the Soviet Union. After 1984, the rank of marshal was preserved only in the air force and artillery. Later, the rank of marshal stopped being conferred even in these branches. The regulations of Russian Army, confirmed in 1993, unified the system of general ranks in all the branches. The ranks of marshal of the artillery and marshal of the aviation were replaced by the one of general of the army (or army aviation), and the rank of chief marshal was cancelled.

Shoulder boards & epaulettes

List of marshals of the branch

Marshals of the artillery
Nikolai Nikolaevich Voronov; appointed 18 January 1943 (chief marshal 1944)
Nikolai Dmitrievich Yakovlev; appointed 21 February 1944, rank removed 1952–1953
Mikhail Nikolaevich Chistiakov; appointed 25 September 1944
Mitrofan Ivanovich Nedelin; appointed 4 August 1953 (chief marshal 1955)
Sergei Sergeevich Varentsov; appointed 11 March 1955 (chief marshal 1961), degraded to major general 1963
Vasili Ivanovich Kazakov; appointed 11 March 1955
Konstantin Petrovich Kazakov; appointed 28 April 1962
Yuri Pavlovich Bazhanov; appointed 18 June 1965
Pavel Nikolaevich Kuleshov; appointed 28 October 1967
Georgy Fedotovich Odintsov; appointed 22 February 1968
Georgy Yefimovich Peredelsky; appointed 5 November 1973
Yefim Vasilyevich Boychuk; appointed 4 November 1980
Vladimir Mikhailovich Mikhalkin; appointed 15 February 1989

Marshals of aviation
Alexander Alexandrovich Novikov; appointed 17 March 1943 (chief marshal 1944)
Alexander Yevgenievich Golovanov; appointed 3 August 1943 (chief marshal 1944)
Fedor Alexeevich Astakhov; appointed 19 August 1944
Fedor Yakovlevich Falaleev; appointed 19 August 1944
Sergei Alexandrovich Khudyakov; appointed 19 August 1944
Nikolai Semyonovich Skripko; appointed 19 August 1944
Grigory Alexeevich Vorozheikin; appointed 19 August 1944
Semyon Fedorovich Zhavoronkov; appointed 25 September 1944
Konstantin Andreevich Vershinin; appointed 3 June 1946 (chief marshal … 1959)
Pavel Fedorovich Zhigarev; appointed 3 August 1953 (chief marshal … 1955)
Sergei Ignatevich Rudenko; appointed 11 March 1955
Vladimir Alexandrovich Sudets; appointed 11 March 1955
Stepan Akimovich Krasovsky; appointed 8 May 1959
Yevgeny Yakovlevich Savitsky; appointed 6 May 1961
Filipp Alexandrovich Agaltsov; appointed 28 April 1962
Yevgeny Fyodorovich Loginov; appointed 28 October 1967
Pavel Stepanovich Kutakhov; appointed 1969 (chief marshal 1972)
Ivan Ivanovuch Borzov; appointed 16 December 1972
Alexander Pokryshkin; appointed 16 December 1972
Boris Pavlovich Bugaev; appointed 5 November 1973 (chief marshal 1977)
Georgy Vasilyevich Zimin; appointed 5 November 1973
Alexander Nikolayevich Yefimov; appointed 29 April 1975
Ivan Ivanovich Pstygo; appointed 29 April 1975
Alexander Petrovich Silantyev; appointed 19 February 1976
Alexander Ivanovich Koldunov; appointed 28 October 1977 (chief marshal 1984)
Grigory Petrovich Skorikov; appointed 4 November 1980
Nikolay Mikhailovich Skomorokhov; appointed 2 November 1981
Pyotr Semyonovich Kirsanov; appointed 16 December 1982
Anatoly Ustinovich Konstantinov; appointed 30 April 1985
Ivan Nikitovich Kozhedub; appointed 6 May 1985
Alexander Nikitovich Volkov; appointed 15 February 1989
Yevgeny Ivanovich Shaposhnikov; appointed 26 August 1991

Marshals of the armored troops
Pavel Alekseyevich Rotmistrov; appointed 21 February 1944 (chief marshal 1962)
Yakov Nikolaevich Fedorenko; appointed 21 February 1944
Semyon Iliych Bogdanov; appointed 1 June 1945
Pavel Semenovich Rybalko; appointed 1 June 1945
Mikhail Yefimovich Katukov; appointed 26 October 1959
Pavel Pavlovich Poluboyakov; appointed 28 April 1962
Hamazasp Khachaturovich Babadzhanian; appointed 28 October 1967 (chief marshal 1975)
Oleg Aleksandrovich Losik; appointed 29 April 1975

Marshals of the signal troops
Ivan Terentevich Peresypkin; appointed 21 February 1944
Aleksey Ivanovich Leonov; appointed 6 May 1961
Andrey Ivanovich Belov; appointed 5 November 1973
Nikolai Nikolaevich Alekseev; appointed 25 October 1979

Marshals of engineer troops
Mikhail Petrovich Vorobyev; appointed 21 February 1944
Aleksey Ivanovich Proshlyakov; appointed 6 May 1961
Viktor Kondradevich Charshenko; appointed 16 December 1972
Archil Viktorovich Gelovani; appointed 28  October 1977
Sergey Christoforovich Aganov; appointed 5 May 1980
Nikolay Fyodorovich Sherstopalov; appointed 6 May 1981

See also
Marshal of the Soviet Union
Chief marshal of the branch
Ranks and insignia of the Soviet Armed Forces 1943–1955, and 1955–1991

References 

Military ranks of Russia
Military ranks of the Soviet Union